Hrvatski nogometni klub Hajduk Split is a Croatian football club founded based in the city of Split, that competes in Prva HNL, top football league in the country. The club was founded on 13 February 1911. in Prague, and played its first competitive match on 11 June 1911 against Calcio Spalato, winning 9–0. The first to score for Hajduk was Šime Raunig. The first official game was played on 28 March 1920 in Split Championship against Borac Split, winning 8–0. This article lists various records and statistics related to the club and individual players and managers.

All records and statistics are accurate as of 4 March 2021

Individual records and statistics 

Current players and manager are in bold/italics.

Appearances 
 Most appearances:
 All fixtures – 739,   Frane Matošić (1935–39, 1940–41, 1944–55).
 Official matches – 390,  Vedran Rožić (1972–84).
 In Yugoslav First League – 310,  Ivica Hlevnjak (1962–73).
 In Prva HNL – 199,  Srđan Andrić (1999–2004, 2007–12).
 In football cups – 44,   Ante Miše (1985–94, 1997–2003).
 In European competitions – 49,  Vedran Rožić (1972–84).
 Foreign player with most appearances in all competitions – 214,  Josip Skoko (1995–99, 2008–10).
 Most appearances in one season:
 All official matches – 49,  Vedran Rožić (1983–84).
 All official matches (1992–) – 46,  Mirsad Hibić (1994–95).
 In Yugoslav First League – 34,  Ivica Hlevnjak (1968–69, 1970–71),  Dragan Holcer (1968–69),  Vilson Džoni (1971–72),  Ivica Šurjak (1973–74),   Ivan Buljan (1974–75),  Nenad Šalov,  Boro Primorac (1980–81),  Zlatko Vujović (1984–85),  Dragutin Čelić (1987–88).
 In Prva HNL – 34,  Goran Milović (2013–14),   Marko Livaja (2021–22).
 In Yugoslav Cup – 8,  Dragutin Čelić (1986–87, 1989–90),  Stipe Andrijašević,  Dragi Setinov,  Jerko Tipurić (1986–87),  Nikola Jerkan (1989–90),   Robert Jarni (1990–91).
 In Croatian Cup – 9,  Ante Miše (1992–93) and  Nenad Pralija (1994–95).
 In European competitions – 10,  Vedran Rožić and  Zoran Simović (1983–84),  Aljoša Asanović (1994–95),  Senijad Ibričić and  Jurica Buljat (2010–11).
 Numerous seasons appearances:
Longest-serving player – 11 years, 6 months and 25 days,  Vedran Rožić (from 5 November 1972 to 30 May 1984).
Most major trophies with Hajduk Split – 10,  Luka Peruzović.

Other records in the Croatian First Football League 
 Youngest player – 16 years, 0 month, 2 days,  Luka Vušković (26 February 2023 v Dinamo).
 Oldest player – 37 years, 7 months, 11 days,  Vladimir Balić (10 May 2008 v Zagreb).
 Oldest débutante – 36 years, 3 months, 5 days,  Đovani Roso (22 February 2009 v Dinamo).
 Most substituted player – 53,  Srđan Andrić (1999–2004, 2007–12).
 Most substituted player (one season) – 18,  Ante Erceg (2016–17).
 Most used substitute – 57,  Zvonimir Deranja (1996–2004, 2005–06).
 Most used substitute (one season) – 19,  Mirko Oremuš (2008–09).
 Appearances in most seasons – 10,  Tomislav Erceg (1991–95, 1997–98, 1999–2000, 2001–02, 2006),  Vik Lalić (1993–2001, 2002–03),   Srđan Andrić (1999–2004, 2007–12).

Other records in the European competitions 
 Youngest player – 16 years, 9 month, 13 days,  Nikola Vlašić (17 July 2014 v Dundalk F.C.).
 Oldest player (since 1992) – 36 years, 10 months, 17 days,  Tonči Gabrić (28 September 1998 v ACF Fiorentina) and   Vladimir Balić (16 August 2008 v U.C. Sampdoria).

Most appearances 

Sources: rsssf.com, hrnogomet.com

Goals 

 Most goals:
 In all competitions – 211,   Frane Matošić (1935–39, 1940–41, 1944–55).
 In league matches – 190,    Frane Matošić (1935–39, 1940–41, 1944–55).
 In Yugoslav First League – 179,    Frane Matošić (1935–39, 1940–41, 1944–55).
 In Prva HNL – 81,  Tomislav Erceg (1991–95, 1997–98, 1999–2000, 2001–02, 2006),  Mijo Caktaš (2011–2016, 2018–2021).
 In Yugoslav Cup – 21,    Frane Matošić (1935–39, 1940–41, 1944–55).
 In Croatian Cup – 21,  Tomislav Erceg (1991–95, 1997–98, 1999–2000, 2001–02, 2006).
 In European competitions – 19,  Zlatko Vujović (1976–86).
 Most goals in one season:
 All official matches – 34,  Leo Lemešić (1934–35).
 All official matches (1992–) – 32,  Marko Livaja (2021–22).
 In Yugoslav First League – 26,  Leo Lemešić (1934–35).
 In Prva HNL – 28,  Marko Livaja (2021–2022).
 In Yugoslav Cup – 10,  Vladimir Kragić (1934);  Stjepan Deverić (1986–87).
 In Croatian Cup – 9,  Nikola Kalinić (2007–08). 
 In European competitions – 8,  Zlatko Vujović (1985–1986).
 Most goals in one match:
 In domestic league – 6,  Leo Lemešić (12 May 1935 v FK Slavija),  Ratko Kacijan (2 February 1941 v FK Bačka).
 In domestic cup – 6,  Duje Čop (21 October 2010 v Rudar 47).
 In European competitions – 4,  Slaviša Žungul (19 September 1974 v Keflavík);  Zlatko Vujović (18 September 1985 v Metz).
Oldest goalscorer – 37 years and 1 day,  Frane Matošić, (26 November 1955 v FK Velež).
Foreign player with most goals in all competitions – 49,  Senijad Ibričić (2008–11).

Other goalscoring records in the Croatian First Football League 
 Youngest goalscorer – 17 years, 29 days,  Nikola Vlašić (2 November 2014 v Zadar).
 Oldest goalscorer – 34 years, 5 months, 20 days,  Almir Turković (23 April 2005 v Inter Zaprešić).
 Scored in most consecutive matches – 5,  Ardian Kozniku (1992),  Tomislav Bušić (2004–05),  Marko Livaja (2020–21), (2021–22)
 Scored in most seasons – 8,  Mijo Caktaš (2011–16, 2018–present).
 Most goals in a game – 4,  Tomislav Erceg (14 October 1994 v Belišće),  Márkó Futács (20 May 2017 v Inter Zaprešić).
 Most goals scored as a substitute – 18,  Zvonimir Deranja (1996–2004, 2005–06).
 Most goals scored as a substitute (one season) – 8,  Zvonimir Deranja (1998–99).
 Fastest goal – 15 seconds,  Jean Evrard Kouassi (10 August 2014 v Lokomotiva).
 Most hat-tricks – 3,  Tomislav Erceg (1991–95, 1997–98, 1999–2000, 2001–02, 2006).
 Fastest hat-trick – 8 minutes,  Tomislav Erceg (4 September 1993 v Pazinka). 
 Fastest four goals – 51 minute,  Márkó Futács (20 May 2017 v Inter Zaprešić).
 Most converted penalties – 15,  Mijo Caktaš (2011–16, 2018–present).

Other goalscoring records in European competitions 
Youngest goalscorer – 16 years, 9 months and 13 days,  Nikola Vlašić (17 July 2014 v Dundalk F.C.).
Oldest goalscorer (since 1992) – 33 years, 8 months and 23 days,  Dean Računica (28 August 2003 v FC Haka).

Landmarks 
 First goal:
 Overall –  Šime Raunig (11 June 1911 v Calcio Spalato).
 In Yugoslav First League –  Mirko Machiedo (2 September 1923 v SAŠK).
 In Prva HNL –  Ardian Kozniku (29 February 1992 v Istra).
 In Croatian Cup –  Joško Jeličić (7 April 1992 v Rijeka).
 In European competitions –  Mirko Bonačić (14 August 1927 v Rapid Vienna).
 On Poljud stadium –  Boro Primorac (19 September 1979 v Trabzonspor B.K.).
 Last goal:
 In Yugoslav First League –  Ivica Mornar (16 June 1991 v Proleter).
 In Yugoslav Cup –  Alen Bokšić (8 May 1991 v Red Star).
 On Stari plac stadium –  Mišo Krstičević (5 September 1979 v Dinamo).
 Landmark goals:
 1000th –  Vlado Schönauer (12 September 1954 v Proleter Osijek).
 2000th –  Slaviša Žungul (2 September 1976 v Željezničar).
 3000th –  Nenad Pralija (18 August 1995 v Segesta).
 4000th –  Jean Evrard Kouassi (21 April 2013 v Slaven Belupo).

Top goalscorers 

Sources: rsssf.com, hrnogomet.com

Goalkeeping 
 Most appearances:
 In Yugoslav First League – 181,  Radomir Vukčević (1963–73).
 In Prva HNL – 164,  Stipe Pletikosa (1997–2003, 2005–06).
 In Yugoslav Cup – 24,  Radomir Vukčević (1963–73).
 In Croatian Cup – 31,  Stipe Pletikosa (1997–2003, 2005–06).
 In European competitions – 24,  Tonči Gabrić (2004–09, 2011–12).
 In all competitions – 221,  Radomir Vukčević (1963–73). 
 Longest run without conceding a goal: 
 In Yugoslav First League – 789 minutes,  Rizah Mešković (1973–74). Also an overall record in Yugoslav First League.
 In Prva HNL – 776 minutes,  Lovre Kalinić (2015–16).
 Most clean sheets:
 In Yugoslav First League – 57 in 181 apps,  Radomir Vukčević (1963–73).
 In Prva HNL – 77 in 164 apps,  Stipe Pletikosa (1997–2003, 2005–06). 
 Most clean sheets in one season:
 In Yugoslav First League – 18 in 31 apps,  Ivan Katalinić (1975–76).
 In Prva HNL – 19 in 31 apps,  Lovre Kalinić (2015–16). 
 Most goals:
 In all competitions – 16,  Ante Vulić (1951–62).

Sources: hrnogomet.com

Disciplinary 
 Most yellow cards:
 In Prva HNL – 49,  Srđan Andrić (1999–2004, 2007–12).
 In Prva HNL (one season) – 12,  Dario Damjanović (2005–06),  Boris Pandža (2008–09),  Mario Maloča (2014–15).
 In Croatian Cup – 10,  Ante Miše (1985–94, 1997–2003).
 Most red cards:
 In Prva HNL – 6,  Ante Miše (1985–94, 1997–2003),  Darijo Srna (1999–2003).
 In Prva HNL (one season) – 3,  Saša Peršon (1992–93).
 In Croatian Cup – 2,  Jurica Buljat (2005–11),  Mladen Pelaić (2007–10).
 Most appearances without a card:
 In Prva HNL – 35,  Stipe Andrijašević (1983–92, 1994–95).
 In Croatian Cup – 31,  Stipe Pletikosa (1997–2003, 2005–06).

Sources: hrnogomet.com

International 
 First capped player for Yugoslavia –  Janko Rodin,  Mirko Kurir (10 February 1924 v Australia).
 First capped player for Croatia –  Igor Štimac (22 December 1990 v Romania).
 First Hajduk player to appear at FIFA World Cup –  Bernard Vukas at 1950 FIFA World Cup (25 June 1950 v Switzerland). 
 Most World Cup appearances while a Hajduk player – 6,  Ivan Buljan,  Ivica Šurjak, for Yugoslavia in 1974.
 Most World Cup goals while a Hajduk player – 2,  Ivica Šurjak, for Yugoslavia in 1974.
 First Hajduk player to appear at UEFA European Championship –  Ante Žanetić at 1960 European Nations' Cup (6 July 1960 v France).
 Most UEFA Championship appearances while a Hajduk player – 4,  Aljoša Asanović, for Croatia in 1996.
 Most UEFA Championship goals while a Hajduk player – 1,  Ante Žanetić, for Yugoslavia in 1960.
 Most caps with Yugoslavia while a Hajduk player – 59,  Bernard Vukas (1947–57, 1959–62).
 Most goals for Yugoslavia while a Hajduk player – 17,  Zlatko Vujović (1976–86).
 Most caps with Croatia while a Hajduk player – 36,  Stipe Pletikosa (1997–2003, 2005–06).
 Most goals for Croatia while a Hajduk player – 4,  Niko Kranjčar (2004–06),  Marko Livaja (2021–present).
 Most caps with other national teams while a Hajduk player – 19,  Senijad Ibričić (2008–11).
 Most goals with other national teams while a Hajduk player – 3,  Maris Verpakovskis (2007–08).
 Most capped foreign players to play for Hajduk – 104,  Maris Verpakovskis with Latvia; 100,  Goce Sedloski with Macedonia; 57,  Hugo Almeida with Portugal;  56,  Ervin Bulku with Albania; 51,  Josip Skoko with Australia; 50,  Artem Milevskyi with Ukraine.

Sources: rsssf.com, hrnogomet.com, soccerway.com

Homegrown players with most appearances in national team

Players that participated on international tournaments while playing for Hajduk

FIFA World Cup 
 1950 FIFA World Cup 5th place
 Vladimir Beara
 Bernard Vukas
 Ervin Katnić
 Ivo Radovniković
 Božo Broketa
 1954 FIFA World Cup 8th place
 Vladimir Beara
 Bernard Vukas
 Zlatko Papec
 1962 FIFA World Cup 4th place
 Andrija Anković
 1974 FIFA World Cup 7th place
 Dražen Mužinić
 Ivan Buljan
 Branko Oblak
 Ivica Šurjak
 Jurica Jerković
 Luka Peruzović
 Rizah Mešković
 1982 FIFA World Cup 16th place
 Ivan Gudelj
 Zoran Vujović
 Zlatko Vujović
 Ivan Pudar
 1990 FIFA World Cup 5th place
 Alen Bokšić
 Robert Jarni
 1998 FIFA World Cup 
 Anthony Šerić
 Igor Tudor
 2002 FIFA World Cup 23rd place
 Stipe Pletikosa
 2006 FIFA World Cup 22nd place
 Niko Kranjčar
 2014 FIFA World Cup 20th place
 Avdija Vršajević
 Tino-Sven Sušić
 2022 FIFA World Cup 
 Marko Livaja

UEFA Euro 

 1960 European Nations' Cup 
 Ante Žanetić
 UEFA Euro 1968 
 Dragan Holcer
 Radomir Vukčević
 UEFA Euro 1976 4th place
 Ivan Buljan
 Dražen Mužinić
 Ivica Šurjak
 Jurica Jerković
 Slaviša Žungul
 Luka Peruzović
 UEFA Euro 1984 8th place
 Zoran Simović
 Ivan Gudelj
 Zlatko Vujović
 Branko Miljuš
 Josip Čop
 UEFA Euro 1996 7th place
 Aljoša Asanović
 Tonči Gabrić
 UEFA Euro 2004 13th place
 Mato Neretljak
 UEFA Euro 2008 5th place
 Nikola Kalinić
 UEFA Euro 2016 9th place
 Lovre Kalinić
 UEFA Euro 2020 13th place
 Lovre Kalinić

Summer Olympics 

 Football at the 1928 Summer Olympics
 Ljubomir Benčić
 Mirko Bonačić
 Football at the 1948 Summer Olympics 
 Bernard Vukas
 Božo Broketa
 Frane Matošić
 Football at the 1952 Summer Olympics 
 Bernard Vukas
 Vladimir Beara
 Slavko Luštica
 Football at the 1956 Summer Olympics 
 Zlatko Papec
 Nikola Radović
 Joško Vidošević
 Football at the 1960 Summer Olympics 
 Andrija Anković
 Zvonko Bego
 Aleksandar Kozlina
 Ante Žanetić
 Football at the 1980 Summer Olympics 4th place
 Nikica Cukrov
 Ivan Gudelj
 Mišo Krstičević
 Zoran Vujović
 Zlatko Vujović
 Football at the 1984 Summer Olympics 
 Ivan Pudar
 Branko Miljuš

Other 

 1996 African Cup of Nations 10th place (Liberia ranking)
 Mass Sarr, Jr.
 1997 FIFA Confederations Cup  (Australia ranking)
 Josip Skoko

Sources: rsssf.com, hrnogomet.com, soccerway.com

Managerial 
 Most appearances for a manager:
 In Yugoslav First League – 170,  Tomislav Ivić (1972, 1973–76, 1978–80, 1987).
 In Prva HNL – 128,  Zoran Vulić (1998, 2000–01, 2002–04, 2006–07, 2018).
 In Croatian Cup – 26,  Zoran Vulić (1998, 2000–01, 2002–04, 2006–07, 2018).
 In European competitions – 24,  Ivan Katalinić (1993–95, 1998–99, 2004).
 Most wins for a manager:
 In Yugoslav First League – 92 in 170 apps,  Tomislav Ivić (1972, 1973–76, 1978–80, 1987).
 In Prva HNL – 83 in 128 apps,  Zoran Vulić (1998, 2000–01, 2002–04, 2006–07, 2018).
 In Croatian Cup – 18 in 26 apps,  Zoran Vulić (1998, 2000–01, 2002–04, 2006–07, 2018).
 In European competitions – 8 in 24 apps,  Ivan Katalinić (1993–95, 1998–99, 2004).
 Youngest manager in Prva HNL – 33 years, 2 months, 24 days,  Slaven Bilić (25 November 2001 v Osijek).
 Oldest manager in Prva HNL – 76 years, 11 months, 22 days,  Stanko Poklepović (11 April 2014 v Istra 1961).
 Longest-serving managers (per appointment) – 7 seasons,  Luka Kaliterna (1923–30);  Ljubo Benčić (1941–48).

Sources: hrnogomet.hr, hajduk.hr, soccerway.com

Awards

Domestic 

Yugoslavian First League top scorers

Croatian First League top scorers

Yugoslav Footballer of the Year
  Ivan Buljan (1975)
  Ivica Šurjak (1976)
  Dražen Mužinić (1977)
  Zlatko Vujović (1981)
  Ivan Gudelj (1982)
  Zoran Simović (1983)
  Blaž Slišković (1985)

Croatian Footballer of the Year
  Stipe Pletikosa (2002)

Hope of the Year
  Jurica Vučko (1996)
  Nikola Kalinić (2007)
  Franko Andrijašević (2012)

Sportske novosti Yellow Shirt award
  Bernard Vukas (1953)
  Joško Vidošević (1955)
  Dragan Holcer (1968)
  Jurica Jerković (1971)
  Branko Oblak (1974)
  Jurica Jerković (1976)
  Zlatko Vujović (1981)
  Zoran Simović (1984)
  Aljoša Asanović (1990)
  Goran Vučević (1992)
  Senijad Ibričić (2010)
  Anas Sharbini (2012)
  Tino-Sven Sušić (2016)
  Mijo Caktaš (2019)

Prva HNL Player of the Year
  Slaven Bilić (1992)
  Ardian Kozniku (1992)
  Joško Jeličić (1993)
  Mirsad Hibić (1994)
  Nenad Pralija (1995)
  Stipe Pletikosa (2001)
  Stipe Pletikosa (2002)
  Tvrtko Kale (2004)
  Niko Kranjčar (2005)
  Nikola Kalinić (2008)

International 

Ballon d'Or candidates

  Branko Oblak (1974) 19th place
  Zlatko Vujović (1981) 19th place

World Soccer Team of the Year 

  Ante Žanetić (1960)

Hajduk Split dream team 
In 2011 during Hajduk's 100th birthday celebration, the local newspaper Slobodna Dalmacija made a public poll for Hajduk fans to vote for Hajduk Split all-time best 11.

Club records and statistics 
Updated 24 June 2017

Competition appearances 
   Yugoslav First League – 61 out of 63 (1923–35, 1936–40, 1946–91).
  Prva HNL – 28 out of 28 (1992–current). One of four clubs that have participated in all seasons, alongside Dinamo Zagreb, Rijeka and Osijek.
   Yugoslav Cup – 50 out of 56.
  Croatian Cup – 28 out of 28 (1992–current).
  European competitions – 48 (1927, 1955–56, 1960–61, 1963–64, 1967–73, 1974–79, 1981–87, 1991–92, 1993–2005, 2007–current).

Final position 
 Best position in   Yugoslav First League – Winner, 9 times (1927, 1929, 1950, 1952, 1954–55, 1970–71, 1973–74, 1974–75, 1978–79).
 Best placed Croatian club in   Yugoslav First League – 24 times 
 Best position in  Prva HNL – Winner, 6 times (1992, 1993–94, 1994–95, 2000–01, 2003–04, 2004–05).
 Best position in   Yugoslav Cup – Winner, 9 times (1966–67, 1971–72, 1973, 1974, 1975–76, 1976–77, 1983–84, 1986–87, 1990–91).
 Best position in  Croatian Cup – Winner, 6 times (1992–93, 1994–95, 1999–2000, 2002–03, 2009–10, 2012–13).
 Worst position in   Yugoslav First League – 13th, 2 times (1965–66, 1987–88).
 Worst position in  Prva HNL – 5th, 2 times (2005–06, 2007–08).

Sources: hrnogomet.hr, hajduk.hr

League records and statistics 
Updated 24 December 2017

 Yugoslav First League (1927–40):
 Matches played – 144 (ranked 1st).
 Wins – 66 (ranked 3rd).
 Draws – 32 (ranked 1st).
 Defeats – 46 (ranked 3rd).
 Goals scored – 310 (ranked 2nd).
 Goals conceded – 228 (ranked 3rd).
 Points – 164 (ranked 3rd).
 Yugoslav First League (1946–91):
 Matches played – 312 (ranked 1st).
 Wins – 592 (ranked 4th).
 Draws – 348 (ranked 1st).
 Defeats – 336 (ranked 6th).
 Goals scored – 2113 (ranked 4th).
 Goals conceded – 1487 (ranked 6th).
 Points – 1516 (ranked 4th).
 Prva HNL:
 Matches played – 851 (ranked 2nd).
 Wins – 474 (ranked 2nd).
 Draws – 196 (ranked 3rd).
 Defeats – 181 (ranked 10th).
 Goals scored – 1532 (ranked 2nd).
 Goals conceded – 801 (ranked 8th).
 Goals difference – +731 (ranked 2nd).
 Foreign players – 88 (ranked 2nd).

Matches and scorelines

Firsts 
 First match – 11 June 1911 v  Calcio Spalato (9–0), Exhibition game.
 First official match – 28 March 1920 v  Borac Split (8–0), 1920 Split Championship.
 In Yugoslav First League – 2 September 1923 v  SAŠK (3–4).
 In Yugoslav Cup – 24 August 1924 v  Football selection of Sarajevo (6–0).
 In European competitions – 14 August 1927 v  SK Rapid Wien (1–8), Mitropa Cup 1927.
 At Poljud stadium – 19 September 1979 v  Trabzonspor B.K. (1–0), 1979–80 European Cup.
 In Prva HNL – 29 February 1992 v  Istra (3–1).
 In Croatian Cup – 24 March 1992 v  Rijeka (0–0).

Lasts 
 At Stari plac – 7 October 1979 v  Vardar (0–0), 1979–80 Yugoslav First League.
 In Yugoslav First League – 16 June 1991 v  Proleter (3–2).
 In Yugoslav Cup – 8 May 1991 v  Red Star (1–0).

Biggest wins 
 Record home official game win – 24–0 (20 November 1927 v  HAŠK Split, 1927 Split Championship).
 Home in Yugoslav First League – 14–0 (7 June 1931 v  FK Ilirija; 16 September 1934 v  FK Slavija (S)).
 Home in Prva HNL – 10–0 (5 June 1994 v  Radnik).
 Home in Yugoslav Cup – 15–0 (3 December 1950 v  Sobota).
 Home in Croatian Cup – 11–0 (17 August 1993 v  Primorac Biograd).
 Home in European competitions – 7–1 (19 September 1974 v  Keflavík, 1974–75 European Cup).
 Record away official game win – 10–0 (4 August 1946 v  Jedinstvo Surčin, 1946 SR Croatia League).
 Away in Yugoslav First League – 6–0 (20 October 1935 v  Osvit (Š); 30 September 1951 v  Napredak; 30 April 1955 v  Dinamo).
 Away in Prva HNL – 6–1 (13 April 1996 v  Zagreb).
 Away in Yugoslav Cup – 9–1 (4 August 1966 v  Metalac (Z)).
 Away in Croatian Cup – 10–2 (21 September 2010 v  Rudar 47).
 Away in European competitions – 8–0 (29 August 2002 v  GÍ Gøta, 2002–03 UEFA Cup).

Biggest defeats 
 Home in Yugoslav First League – 1–6 (11 December 1955 v  Vojvodina).
 Home in Prva HNL – 1–5 (17 August 2001 v  Varteks), 0–4 (10 August 2016 v  Dinamo Zagreb).
 Home in Yugoslav Cup – 0–4 (7 November 1954 v  Partizan).
 Home in Croatian Cup – 0–3 (23 September 1992 v  Split).
 Home in European competitions – 0–5 (3 August 2005 v  Debreceni, 2005–06 UEFA Champions League).
 Away in Yugoslav First League – 0–9 (6 June 1940 v  BSK).
 Away in Prva HNL – 0–4 (27 March 1994 v  Croatia Zagreb; 22 September 2007 v  Rijeka; 19 March 2008 v  Varteks; 16 May 2015 v  Dinamo).
 Away in Yugoslav Cup – 0–6 (1 August 1926 v  Belgrade XI)
 Away in Croatian Cup – 0–5 (4 December 2013 v  Dinamo).
 Away in European competitions – 0–6 (3 August 2005 v  Ajax, 1993–94 UEFA Champions League).

Highest scoring draws 
 In Yugoslav First League – 5–5 (11 August 1929 v  BSK).
 In Prva HNL – 3–3, 6 times.
 In European competitions – 2–2, 8 times.
 In Yugoslav Cup – 3–3 (31 May 1969 v  Dinamo).
 In Croatian Cup – 3–3 (27 April 1994 v  Rijeka; 22 May 2013 v  Lokomotiva).

Sources: hrnogomet.hr, hajduk.hr

Records and statistics by season

Points 
 Most points in one season:
 3 pts for a win – 78 in 32 matches (2003–04).
 2 pts for a win – 50 in 34 matches (1978–79, 1993–94).
 Highest percentage of points in one season:
 3 pts for a win – 81.25% (2003–04).
 2 pts for a win – 86.1% (1940–41).
 Fewest points in one season:
 3 pts for a win – 40 in 32 matches (2005–06).
 2 pts for a win – 5 in 10 matches (1939–40).
 Lowest percentage of points in one season:
 3 pts for a win – 41.66% (2005–06).
 2 pts for a win – 25.0% (1939–40).

Wins 
 Most wins in one season:
 All official fixtures – 31 in 44 matches (2002–03).
 In   Yugoslav First League – 20 in 34 matches (1974–75, 1978–79).
 In  Prva HNL – 25 in 32 matches (2003–04).
 Home in   Yugoslav First League – 15 in 17 matches (1978–79).
 Home in  Prva HNL – 15 in 16 matches (2002–03).
 Away in   Yugoslav First League – 8 in 17 matches (1974–75).
 Away in  Prva HNL – 11 in 16 matches (2003–04).
 In   Yugoslav Cup – 5 in 5 matches (1971–72, 1974, 1975–76).
 In  Croatian Cup – 7 in 8 matches (2002–03).
 In  European competitions – 6 in 10 matches (1983–84 UEFA Cup). 
 Fewest wins in one season: 
 All official fixtures – 9 in 32 matches (1964–65), 10 in 41 matches (1987–88).
 In   Yugoslav First League – 7 in 28 matches (1964–65), 8 in 34 matches (1987–88).
 In  Prva HNL – 10 in 32 matches (2005–06).
 Home in   Yugoslav First League – 6 in 14 matches (1964–65), 8 in 17 matches (1987–88).
 Home in  Prva HNL – 7 in 17 matches (2012–13).
 Away in   Yugoslav First League – 0 in 17 matches (1968–69, 1987–88), 0 in 15 matches (1965–66).
 Away in  Prva HNL – 2 in 16 matches (2005–06).

Defeats 
 Most defeats in one season: 
 All official fixtures – 20 in 48 matches (1972–73).
 In   Yugoslav First League – 17 in 34 matches (1972–73).
 In  Prva HNL – 13 in 36 matches (2014–15).
 Home in   Yugoslav First League – 5 in 17 matches (1968–69).
 Home in  Prva HNL – 4 in 18 matches (2014–15).
 Away in   Yugoslav First League – 16 in 17 matches (1972–73).
 Away in  Prva HNL – 9 in 18 matches (2014–15).
 In domestic cups – 3 in 8 matches (2004–05).
 In  European competitions – 6 in 10 matches (2010–11 UEFA Europa League).
 Fewest defeats in one season:
 All official fixtures – 1 in 23 matches (1950).
 In   Yugoslav First League – unbeaten in 18 matches (1950).
 In  Prva HNL – 2 in 22 matches (1992), 3 in 30 matches (1994–95).
 Home in   Yugoslav First League – 0 in 5 matches (1930), 0 in 9 matches (1950), 0 in 10 matches (1933), 0 in 11 matches (1951, 1960–61),  0 in 17 matches (1970–71, 1980–81).
 Home in  Prva HNL – 0 in 15 matches (1992–93, 1994–95), 0 in 16 matches (1995–96, 2002–03).
 Away in   Yugoslav First League – 0 in 5 matches (1929), 0 in 9 matches (1950).
 Away in  Prva HNL – 1 in 11 matches (1992), 3 in 15 matches (1994–95, 2001–02), 4 in 18 matches (2016–17).

Draws 
 Most draws in one season:
 All official fixtures – 17 in 42 matches (1968–69).
 In   Yugoslav First League – 16 in 34 matches (1968–69).
 In  Prva HNL – 11 in 36 matches (2013–14), 10 in 30 matches (1992–93).
 Home in   Yugoslav First League – 7 in 17 matches (1983–84, 1987–88), 5 in 14 matches (1964–65), 4 in 9 matches (1950).
 Home in  Prva HNL – 5 in 17 matches (2013–14, 2014–15, 2015–16), 4 in 15 matches (1992–93).
 Away in   Yugoslav First League – 11 in 17 matches (1968–68), 5 in 9 matches (1948–49).
 Away in  Prva HNL – 8 in 16 matches (1998–99).
 In domestic cups – 3 in 8 matches, 5 times.
 In  European competitions – 3 in 4 matches (1969–70 Mitropa Cup).
 Fewest draws in one season: 
 All official fixtures – 1 in 19 matches (1952), 2 in 20 matches (1933), 3 in 32 matches (1953–54), 4 in 47 matches (1972–73).
 In   Yugoslav First League – 1 in 16 matches (1952), 2 in 20 matches (1933), 3 in 34 matches (1972–73, 1989–90).
 In  Prva HNL – 3 in 32 matches (2003–04).
 Home in   Yugoslav First League – 0 in 11 matches (1951), 1 in 17 matches (1978–79, 1981–82).
 Home in  Prva HNL – 1 in 17 matches (1993–94).
 Away in   Yugoslav First League – 0 in 17 matches (1972–73).
 Away in  Prva HNL – 2 in 16 matches (2003–04, 2009–10).

Goals 
 Most goals scored in one season:
 All official fixtures – 112 in 46 matches (1993–94), 103 in 36 matches (1934–35).
 In   Yugoslav First League – 72 in 24 matches (1934–35).
 In  Prva HNL – 84 in 34 matches (1993–94).
 Home in   Yugoslav First League – 58 in 12 matches (1934–35).
 Home in  Prva HNL – 61 in 17 matches (1993–94).
 Away in   Yugoslav First League – 31 in 13 matches (1980–81).
 Away in  Prva HNL – 29 in 15 matches (2001–02).
 In domestic cups – 31 in 12 matches (1934), 28 in 10 matches (1994–95), 25 in 5 matches (1950).
 In  European competition – 17 in 6 matches (1975–76 European Cup), 17 in 8 matches (2015–16 UEFA Europa League).
 Fewest goals scored in one season: 
 All official fixtures – 31 in 24 matches (1961–62), 40 in 32 matches (1964–65), 50 in 43 matches (1976–77).
 In   Yugoslav First League – 39 in 17 matches (1983–84), 28 in 14 matches (1964–65), 26 in 13 matches (1962–63).
 In  Prva HNL – 40 in 32 matches (2005–06).
 Home in   Yugoslav First League – 23 in 17 matches (1986–87), 16 in 14 matches (1964–65).
 Home in  Prva HNL – 25 in 15 matches (2011–12), 27 in 18 matches (2015–16).
 Away in   Yugoslav First League – 5 in 17 matches (1972–73).
 Away in  Prva HNL – 10 in 16 matches (2005–06).
 Most goals conceded in one season: 
 All official fixtures – 68 in 48 matches (2014–15), 62 in 41 matches (1971–72, 1987–88), 60 in 36 matches (1934–35), 58 in 28 matches (1939–40),  51 in 30 matches (1957–58).
 In   Yugoslav First League – 56 in 34 matches (1971–72), 44 in 26 matches (1963–64), 38 in 18 matches (1937–38), 35 in 22 matches (1952–53, 1958–59),  29 in 10 matches (1939–40).
 In  Prva HNL – 56 in 36 matches (2014–15).
 Home in   Yugoslav First League – 25 in 17 matches (1963–64), 20 in 13 matches (1955–56).
 Home in  Prva HNL – 25 in 18 matches (2014–15).
 Away in   Yugoslav First League – 37 in 17 matches (1972–73), 33 in 13 matches (1963–64), 28 in 9 matches (1937–38).
 Away in  Prva HNL – 31 in 18 matches (2014–15).
 In domestic cups – 22 in 12 matches (1934), 10 in 8 matches (2004–05).
 In  European competition – 18 in 10 matches (2010–11 UEFA Europa League), 13 in 6 matches (1981–82 UEFA Cup), 9 in 2 matches (1927 Mitropa Cup).
 Fewest goals conceded in one season:
 All official fixtures – 11 in 14 matches (1932), 15 in 24 matches (1992), 28 in 45 matches (1975–76).
 In   Yugoslav First League – 11 in 14 matches (1932), 13 in 18 matches (1950), 22 in 34 matches (1975–76, 1983–84).
 In  Prva HNL – 14 in 22 matches (1992), 22 in 32 matches (2002–03).
 Home in   Yugoslav First League – 7 in 17 matches (1969–70), 4 in 10 matches (1933), 3 in 7 matches (1932).
 Home in  Prva HNL – 5 in 16 matches (2002–03), 5 in 11 matches (1992).
 Away in   Yugoslav First League – 11 in 17 matches (1973–74).
 Away in  Prva HNL – 9 in 11 matches (1992), 12 in 15 matches (1994–95), 13 in 16 matches (2003–04), 14 in 18 matches (2016–17).

Goal difference 
 Best league goal difference in one season: 
 In   Yugoslav First League – +42 in 26 matches (1954–55).
 In  Prva HNL – +48 in 34 matches (1993–94).
 Home in   Yugoslav First League – +45 in 12 matches (1934–35).
 Home in  Prva HNL – +47 in 17 matches (1993–94).
 Away in   Yugoslav First League – +9 in 9 matches (1948–49).
 Away in  Prva HNL – +14 in 15 matches (2001–02).
 Worst league goal difference in one season: 
 In   Yugoslav First League – -17 in 26 matches (1962–63).
 In  Prva HNL – +3 in 36 matches (2014–15).
 Home in   Yugoslav First League – +3 in 13 matches (1962–63).
 Home in  Prva HNL – +11 in 18 matches (2014–15).
 Away in   Yugoslav First League – -32 in 17 matches (1972–73).
 Away in  Prva HNL – -8 in 36 matches (2014–15), -8 in 32 matches (2006–06).

Disciplinary 
 Prva HNL only.
 Yellow cards:
 Most (total) – 106 in 36 matches (2014–15).
 Fewest (total) – 28 in 22 matches (1992).
 Most (average per match) – 2.944 (2014–15).
 Fewest (average per match) – 1.273 (1992).
 Red cards:
 Most (total) – 14 in 32 matches (2002–03).
 Fewest (total) – 2 in 30 matches (1994–95, 2009–10, 2010–11).
 Most (average per match) – 0.438 (2002–03).
 Fewest (average per match) – 0.056 (2014–15).

Sources: hrnogomet.hr, hajduk.hr

Sequences and runs 
Currently active sequences are in bold/italics.

Goals 
 Longest streak without conceding a goal: 
 In   Yugoslav First League – 789 minutes (25 Nov 1973 to 27 Mar 1974).
 In  Prva HNL – 776 minutes (10 Aug 2015 to 24 Oct 2015).
 In   Yugoslav Cup – at least 540 minutes (28 Nov 1973 to 23 Sep 1975).
 In  Croatian Cup – 705 minutes (7 Apr 1992 to 5 May 1993).
 In  European competitions – 461 minutes (29 Sep 1993 to 19 Oct 1994).
 Longest streak without scoring a goal:
 In   Yugoslav First League – 4 matches (3 times).
 In  Prva HNL – 359 minutes (19 Nov 2005 to 25 Feb 2006).
 In   Yugoslav Cup – at least 180 minutes (4 times).
 In  Croatian Cup – 353 minutes (18 Apr 2001 to 16 Oct 2002). 
 In  European competitions – 319 minutes (5 Nov 1986 to 30 Sep 1987).
 Longest scoring run:
 In   Yugoslav First League – 25 matches (9 Jun 1940 to 20 Oct 1946).
 In  Prva HNL – 20 matches (22 Sep 2002 to 3 May 2003).
 In   Yugoslav Cup – 30 matches (2 Dec 1970 to 15 Feb 1978).
 In  Croatian Cup – 14 matches (6 Oct 1992 to 15 Mar 1994).
 In  European competitions – 10 matches (19 Mar 1980 to 20 Oct 1982).
 Longest conceding run:
 In   Yugoslav First League – 13 matches (16 excluding qualifiers for 1935–36 season) (21 Apr 1935 to 27 Sep 1936).
 In  Prva HNL – 10 matches (2 May 1999 to 29 Aug 1999).
 In   Yugoslav Cup – 8 matches (2 times).
 In  Croatian Cup – 8 matches (10 Apr 2013 to 18 Dec 2013). 
 In  European competitions – 10 matches (7 Nov 1979 to 22 Sep 1982).

Wins 
 Longest winning streak:
 In   Yugoslav First League – 6 matches (4 times).
 In  Prva HNL – 9 matches (26 Aug 2001 to 28 Oct 2001).
 In   Yugoslav Cup – 12 matches (28 Nov 1973 to 1 Dec 1976).
 In  Croatian Cup – 6 matches (6 Oct 1992 to 21 Apr 1993; 9 Dec 2001 to 23 Apr 2003).
 In  European competitions – 5 matches (17 Sep 1975 to 17 Mar 1976).
 Home in   Yugoslav First League – 13 matches (26 Oct 1975 to 13 Mar 1977).
 Home in  Prva HNL – 15 matches (1 Sep 2002 to 27 Jul 2003).
 Home in   Yugoslav Cup – 12 matches (14 Aug 1955 to 20 Nov 1963).
 Home in  Croatian Cup – 10 matches (21 Oct 1998 to 9 May 2001).
 Home in  European competitions – 8 matches (9 Dec 1981 to 11 Apr 1984).
 Away in   Yugoslav First League – 4 matches (21 June 1953 to 22 Sep 1954).
 Away in  Prva HNL – 6 matches (4 Apr 1992 to 16 May 1992).
 Away in   Yugoslav Cup – 5 matches (3 Nov 1965 to 16 Aug 1967).
 Away in  Croatian Cup – 5 matches (16 May 2001 to 23 Apr 2003).
 Away in  European competitions – 2 matches (4 times). 
 Longest winning streak (one or two-legged knock-out rounds):
 In   Yugoslav Cup – 27 rounds (23 Feb 1972 to 15 Feb 1978).
 In  Croatian Cup – 9 rounds (22 Sep 1999 to 18 Apr 2001).
 In  European competitions – 4 rounds (14 Sep 1983 to 21 Mar 1984).

Unbeaten 
 Longest streak without a loss:
 In   Yugoslav First League – 25 matches (15 May 1949 to 8 Apr 1951).
 In  Prva HNL – 21 matches (5 Mar 1995 to 20 Sep 1995).
 In   Yugoslav Cup – 28 matches (23 Feb 1972 to 15 Feb 1978).
 In  Croatian Cup – 20 matches (17 Aug 1993 to 11 Oct 1995).
 In  European competitions – 7 matches (18 Sep 1985 to 19 Mar 1986). 
 Home in   Yugoslav First League – 30 matches (16 Nov 1958 to 1 Oct 1961).
 Home in  Prva HNL – 49 matches (6 Mar 1994 to 23 Mar 1997).
 Home in   Yugoslav Cup – 26 matches in (14 Oct 1964 to 15 Feb 1978).
 Home in  Croatian Cup – 19 matches in (6 Oct 1992 to 15 Apr 1998).
 Home in  European competitions – 16 matches in (22 Dec 1968 to 4 Nov 1976).
 Away in   Yugoslav First League – 12 matches (18 May 1949 to 8 Apr 1951).
 Away in  Prva HNL – 10 matches (7 Mar 1992 to 26 May 1992).
 Away in   Yugoslav Cup – 12 matches (15 Mar 1972 to 17 Oct 1979).
 Away in  Croatian Cup – 11 matches (16 Oct 2001 to 8 Mar 2005).
 Away in  European competitions – 5 matches (19 Jul 2007 to 29 Jul 2010).

Winless 
 Longest streak without a win:
 In   Yugoslav First League – 9 matches (16 Aug 1964 to 12 Nov 1964).
 In  Prva HNL – 8 matches (13 May 2018 to 1 Sep 2018).
 In   Yugoslav Cup – 5 matches (26 Feb 1978 to 11 Nov 1981; 26 Aug 1999 to 8 Aug 2001).
 In  Croatian Cup – 3 matches (3 times).
 In  European competitions – 7 matches (2 Nov 1994 to 17 Jul 1996; 26 Aug 1999 to 8 Aug 2001).
 Home in   Yugoslav First League – 5 matches (9 Jun 1963 to 17 Nov 1963).
 Home in  Prva HNL – 4 matches (1 Mar 2015 to 18 Apr 2015).
 Home in   Yugoslav Cup – 4 matches (8 Oct 1986 to 2 May 1990).
 Home in  Croatian Cup – 2 matches (5 times; current streak started on 4 March 2015 –).
 Home in  European competitions – 3 matches (3 times). 
 Away in   Yugoslav First League – 23 matches (13 Dec 1964 to 4 Sep 1966).
 Away in  Prva HNL – 11 matches (7 Dec 1997 to 21 Aug 1998).
 Away in   Yugoslav Cup – 6 matches (14 Sep 1924 to 24 Jun 1934; 1 Jul 1934 to 26 Nov 1950).
 Away in  Croatian Cup – 3 matches (4 times).
 Away in  European competitions – 9 matches (30 Jun 1963 to 27 Sep 1972; 14 Aug 2008 to 9 Aug 2012).

Defeats 
 Longest losing streak:
 In   Yugoslav First League – 5 matches (11 May 1980 to 1 June 1980).
 In  Prva HNL – 4 matches (22 Mar 2015 to 18 Apr 2015).
 In   Yugoslav Cup – 3 matches (29 Jan 1939 to 2 Nov 1949).
 In  Croatian Cup – 2 matches (5 times).
 In  European competitions – 6 matches (21 Oct 2010 to 19 Jul 2012).
 Home in   Yugoslav First League – 3 matches (12 Jun 1966 to 16 Oct 1966).
 Home in  Prva HNL – 2 matches (8 times).
 Home in   Yugoslav Cup – 2 matches (11 Mar 1987 to 9 Aug 1989).
 Home in  Croatian Cup – 2 matches (9 May 2001 to 6 Nov 2002). 
 Home in  European competitions – 3 matches (4 Nov 2010 to 10 Jul 2012). 
 Away in   Yugoslav First League – 18 matches (17 May 1972 to 20 May 1973).
 Away in  Prva HNL – 5 matches (6 Apr 2014 to 27 Jul 2014).
 Away in   Yugoslav Cup – 6 matches (1 Jul 1934 to 26 Nov 1950).
 Away in  Croatian Cup – 1 match.
 Away in  European competitions – 5 matches (3 times).

Draws 
 Longest drawing streak:
 In   Yugoslav First League – 4 matches (5 times).
 In  Prva HNL – 4 matches (7 Mar 1993 to 28 Mar 1993).
 In   Yugoslav Cup – 2 matches (5 times).
 In  Croatian Cup – 3 matches (30 Mar 1994 to 27 Apr 1994).
 In  European competitions – 3 matches (26 Nov 1969 to 10 Apr 1970; 2 Aug 2000 to 8 Aug 2001).
 Home in   Yugoslav First League – 3 matches (27 Aug 1950 to 24 Sep 1950; 13 Sep 1986 to 18 Oct 1986).
 Home in  Prva HNL – 4 matches (9 Nov 1992 to 28 Mar 1993).
 Home in   Yugoslav Cup – 2 matches (15 Jan 1939 to 22 Jan 1939; 9 Aug 1989 to 8 Nov 1989).
 Home in  Croatian Cup – 2 matches (14 May 2008 to 4 Mar 2009). 
 Home in  European competitions – 2 matches (3 times). 
 Away in   Yugoslav First League – 5 matches (25 Aug 1968 to 17 Nov 1968; 5 Oct 1983 to 29 Feb 1984).
 Away in  Prva HNL – 4 matches (22 Jul 2007 to 2 Sep 2007).
 Away in   Yugoslav Cup – 2 matches (20 Aug 1987 to 10 Aug 1988).
 Away in  Croatian Cup – 3 matches (8 Nov 1994 to 19 Apr 1995).
 Away in  European competitions – 2 matches (5 times).

Sources: hrnogomet.hr, hajduk.hr

Opponents and familiarity 
 Club played most often (all official matches) – 212 times v.   Dinamo Zagreb. 
 Club played most often in domestic leagues – 173 times v.   Dinamo Zagreb.
 Club played most often in domestic cups – 31 times v.   Dinamo Zagreb.
 Club played most often in European competitions – 6 times v.  Tottenham Hotspur (1967–68, 1983–84, 1991–92).
 Club played most often in one season – 7 times v.  Rijeka (2005–06); v.  Dinamo Zagreb (2013–14).

Records and statistics against major rivals 
Updated 24 December 2017

v. Dinamo Zagreb 

 Biggest wins and defeats:
 Home win in  Yugoslav First League – 5–1 (1957–58, 25 August 1957).
 Home win in  Prva HNL – 4–1 (2002–03, 11 May 2003).
 Away win in  Yugoslav First League – 6–0 (1954–55, 3 April 1955).
 Away win in  Prva HNL – 2–0 (2008–09, 21 September 2008), 2–0 (2016–17, 22 April 2017).
 Home defeat in  Yugoslav First League – 1–5 (1971–72, 4 June 1972).
 Home defeat in  Prva HNL – 0–4 (2016–17, 10 August 2016).
 Away defeat in  Yugoslav First League – 1–5 (1952–53, 31 May 1953), 0–4 (1957–58, 2 March 1958).
 Away defeat in  Prva HNL – 0–4 (1993–94, 27 March 1993), 0–4 (2014–15, 16 May 2015). 
 Longest winning streak:
 Overall – 6 matches (29 May 1960 to 18 March 1962).
 Home – 6 matches (18 September 1993 to 28 April 1996).
 Away – 3 matches (3 March 1974 to 7 September 1975).
 Longest losing streak:
 Overall – 6 matches (4 December 2013 to 22 November 2014).
 Home – 3 matches (18 December 2013 to 31 August 2014).
 Away – 6 matches (1995–99, 2006–08).
 Longest unbeaten streak:
 Overall – 7 matches (1966–69, 1974–76).
 Home – 14 matches (15 October 1950 to 2 December 1962).
 Away – 4 matches (12 December 1964 to 12 October 1969).
 Longest streak without a win:
 Overall – 13 matches (14 September 2013 to 20 March 2016).
 Home – 6 matches (14 September 2013 to 20 March 2016).
 Away – 18 matches (21 September 2008 to 22 April 2017).
 Longest drawing streak:
 Overall – 3 matches (1982–83; 1999–2000).
 Home – 2 matches (7 times).
 Away – 4 matches (12 Dec 1965 to 20 Oct 1968).

Sources: hrnogomet.hr, hajduk.hr

v. HNK Rijeka 

 Biggest wins and defeats:
 Home win in  Yugoslav First League – 6–2 (1958–59, 7 June 1959), 4–0 (1959–60, 13 September 1959), 4–0 (1965–66, 24 October 1965),  4–0 (1988–89, 28 May 1989).
 Home win in  Prva HNL – 4–0 (2003–04, 28 February 2004).
 Away win in  Yugoslav First League – 4–1 (1974–75, 29 June 1975).
 Away win in  Prva HNL – 3–0 (1995–96, 17 February 1996), 3–0 (2011–12, 21 March 2012).
 Home defeat in  Yugoslav First League – 1–3 (1975–76, 13 September 1975), 0–2 (1962–63, 24 March 1963).
 Home defeat in  Prva HNL – 0–4 (2005–06, 22 April 2006).
 Away defeat in  Yugoslav First League – 0–4 (1962–63, 9 September 1962).
 Away defeat in  Prva HNL – 0–4 (2007–08, 22 September 2007). 
 Longest winning streak:
 Overall – 10 matches (26 November 2000 to 12 March 2005).
 Home – 7 matches (23 November 1999 to 9 April 2005).
 Away – 4 matches (28 November 2001 to 12 March 2005).
 Longest losing streak:
 Overall – 5 matches (1 November 2015 to 5 November 2016).
 Home – 4 matches (18 April 2015 to 11 March 2017).
 Away – 3 matches (3 times).
 Longest unbeaten streak:
 Overall – 12 matches (3 November 1979 to 9 March 1986).
 Home – 18 matches (26 February 1978 to 12 December 1993).
 Away – 6 matches (30 July 1989 to 8 June 1994).
 Longest streak without a win:
 Overall – 20 matches (21 March 2012 to 2 December 2017).
 Home – 11 matches (7 August 2011 to current).
 Away – 14 matches (4 April 1976 to 10 October 1990).
 Longest drawing streak:
 Overall – 3 matches (1983–84; 2013).
 Home – 4 matches (2 December 2012 to 5 October 2014).
 Away – 5 matches (10 June 1981 to 18 November 1984).

Sources: hrnogomet.hr, hajduk.hr

Average attendance record on Poljud stadium 

Note: records in gold were that seasons highest league average attendance.

Sources:  hrnogomet.com

Penalty shoot-out history 
Hajduk participated in 55 penalty shoot-outs, and holds a record of 32 wins, and 23 losses.

1During 1988–89 season teams in Yugoslav First League approached penalty shoot-out after every regular time tie.

2During 1989–90 season teams in Yugoslav First League approached penalty shoot-out after every regular time tie.

3During 1990–91 season teams in Yugoslav First League approached penalty shoot-out after every regular time tie.

Sources: Glasilo Hrvatskog nogometnog saveza

External links 
Croatian Football Statistics (www.hrnogomet.com) 
Football in the former Yugoslavia (www.exyufudbal.in.rs) 
Historical domestic results (www.rsssf.com)

References 

HNK Hajduk Split
Croatian football club statistics